The Laredo striped whiptail (Aspidoscelis laredoensis) is a species of lizard found in the southern United States, in Texas, and northern Mexico in Coahuila, Nuevo Leon, and Tamaulipas. Some sources believe it to be the result of extensive hybridization between the Texas spotted whiptail, Aspidoscelis gularis and the six-lined racerunner, Aspidoscelis sexlineatus. It is one of many lizard species known to be parthenogenic.

Description 
The Laredo striped whiptail grows from 6 to 11 inches in length. It has an overall color of dark green or dark brown, with 7 yellow or white stripes that run from head to tail, and a white underside. They are thin bodied, with a long tail.

Behavior 
Like other species of whiptail lizard, it is diurnal and insectivorous. They are wary, energetic, and fast moving, darting for cover if approached. Its preferred habitat is areas with sandy soils and sparse vegetation. They are often found in cultivated fields and pasture land. The species reproduces through parthenogenesis, the female lays up to four unfertilized eggs in mid summer, which hatch in approximately six weeks.

References 

Herps of Texas: Cnemidophorus laredoensis
 Herpetologica: Karyotypes of the Parthenogenetic Whiptail Lizard Cnemidophorus laredoensis and Its Presumed Parental Species (Sauria: Teiidae)

Aspidoscelis
Laredo, Texas
Reptiles of the United States
Reptiles of Mexico
Reptiles described in 1973
Taxa named by Charles O. McKinney
Taxa named by Fenton R. Kay
Taxa named by Robert A. Anderson